New Zealand singer-songwriter Lorde (born 1996) has recorded songs for three studio albums, one extended play (EP) and guest features. At the age of 13, she was signed to Universal Music Group (UMG) and started to write music. In November 2012, when she was 16 years old, she self-released an EP entitled The Love Club via SoundCloud. It was made available for purchase in March 2013. In September 2013, Lorde released her debut studio album, Pure Heroine, that included "Royals". The record explored a dream pop and minimalist electronic sound. Released in 2017, her second studio album, Melodrama, showcased Lorde's interest in piano instrumentation and maximalist pop music. Lorde's 3rd studio album, Solar Power, was released on 20 August 2021, presenting a sonic shift towards acoustic guitars and stripped-down production alongside a thematic shift towards escapism, introspection, and fame.

In addition to her studio work, Lorde has recorded songs for film soundtracks, including "Everybody Wants to Rule the World", originally recorded by band Tears for Fears, from The Hunger Games: Catching Fire (2013), and "Yellow Flicker Beat" from The Hunger Games: Mockingjay, Part 1 (2014), Furthermore, she has recorded vocals for features, including "Easy (Switch Screens)" with Son Lux, "Magnets" with Disclosure, and "Don't Take the Money" with Bleachers.

Songs

See also
 Lorde discography

Notes

References

Lorde
 List